Gobiletria is a moth genus in the family Autostichidae. It contains the species Gobiletria kaszabi, which is found in Mongolia.

References

Holcopogoninae